The Russian route M1 (also known as the Belarus Highway, road to Minsk) is a major trunk road that runs from Moscow through Smolensk before reaching the border with Belarus. The highway runs south of Odintsovo, Kubinka, Mozhaysk, Gagarin, north of Vyazma, through Safonovo and Yartsevo. After crossing the border with Belarus, the highway continues (as olimpijka) to Minsk, Brest, and Warsaw. The entire route is part of European route E30 and AH6.

During the 1980 Summer Olympics, a  stretch between the  mark and the  mark was used for the road team time trial cycling event.

References

Venues of the 1980 Summer Olympics
Olympic cycling venues
Roads in Russia
Constituent roads of European route E30